Carmelo Dominador Flores Morelos (December 12, 1930 – September 17, 2016) was a Filipino Roman Catholic archbishop.

Ordained to the priesthood in 1954, Morelos was appointed as the first bishop of the Roman Catholic Diocese of Butuan in the Philippines in 1967 serving the diocese until 1994 when he transferred to the Roman Catholic Archdiocese of Zamboanga. He served as the archdiocese's bishop until his retirement in 2006.

Morelos also served at the Catholic Bishops' Conference of the Philippines as its president from 1991 to 1995 and was named the chairman of the Mindanao-Sulu Pastoral Conference twice. He was also one of the reported candidates to succeed then retiring Manila Archbishop Jaime Sin who was then set to vacate his post in August 2003.

He died of age-related illness on September 17, 2016.

Notes

1930 births
2016 deaths
21st-century Roman Catholic archbishops in the Philippines
People from Sorsogon
Roman Catholic archbishops of Zamboanga
Presidents of the Catholic Bishops' Conference of the Philippines